"Parasite Eve" is a song by British rock band Bring Me the Horizon. Produced by the band's vocalist Oliver Sykes and keyboardist Jordan Fish and written by the entire band, it was released as the second single from the group's 2020 commercial release Post Human: Survival Horror on 25 June 2020. The song samples "Erghen Diado" written by Petar Lyondev and performed by the Bulgarian Female Vocal Choir; Lyondev is credited as a co-writer.

"Parasite Eve" is the band's second Top 20 single hit in the Scottish Singles Chart.

Promotion and release
The track was teased by Oliver Sykes on Instagram. It was expected to be released on 10 June 2020, but due to the George Floyd protests and the Black Lives Matter movement, the song was postponed to 25 June.

Composition and lyrics
"Parasite Eve" has been described as a nu metal and electronic rock song with some elements of electropop. The song was inspired by the Japanese video game of the same name. It was written and composed by the band while in quarantining during the COVID-19 pandemic. The song samples "Erghen Diado" from the album Le Mystère des Voix Bulgares. The lyrics talk about what is happening during the pandemic, saying that "This is a war" between countries for discovering a vaccine. At the same time, Sykes talks about when the pandemic is overcome, while asking "When we forget the Infection, will we remember the lesson?" to the people and the world leaders like U.S. President Donald Trump and Brazil President Jair Bolsonaro that rejected and ignored the gravity of the virus. Musically, it was influenced a lot by Sykes playing the game Doom Eternal, as well as the contributions of the game soundtrack artist Mick Gordon, giving it a futuristic and cyber overlay. Sykes said about the lyrics of the song amid the similarity of the current world situation:

Music video
The music video for "Parasite Eve" was released on the same day as the single was streamed. Directed by Sykes himself, he took inspiration from some of his favorite video games, films and the genre of nu metal. Using masks a friend of his created, each member filmed their video parts separately. This was an effort to stay within the social distancing restrictions set in place. Due to the lockdown restrictions, the band filmed the video with minimal crew and minimal resources.

Charts

Weekly charts

Year-end charts

Certifications

References

2020 singles
2020 songs
Bring Me the Horizon songs
Songs written by Oliver Sykes
RCA Records singles
Sony Music singles
Nu metal songs
Electronic rock songs
Songs about the COVID-19 pandemic